Oliveridia is a genus of midges and consists of two species: O. hugginsi and O. tricornis.

Oliveridia hugginsi Ferrington and Sæther is known from the Big Caney River in Kansas. It commonly emerges in January. This is the southernmost record of a species of the genus Oliveridia.

References

Chironomidae